Wommack is a surname. Notable people with the surname include:

Andrew Wommack (born 1949), American conservative Evangelical Christian TV evangelist
Dave Wommack (born 1956), American football coach
Roland Wommack (1936–2018), American fencer

See also
Womack (surname)